Acianthera saundersiana is a species of orchid.

saundersiana